"Know thyself" is an Ancient Greek aphorism that means "know thy measure". According to the Greek writer Pausanias, it was the first of three Delphic maxims inscribed in the forecourt of the Temple of Apollo at Delphi. The two maxims that follow "know thyself" were "nothing too much" and "give a pledge (or give security) and trouble is at hand".

The meaning of the phrase is discussed in Plato's Protagoras dialogue, where Socrates lauds the authors of pithy and concise sayings, giving "the far-famed inscriptions, which are in all men's mouths—'Know thyself', and 'Nothing too much. as examples. Socrates attributes these sayings to one of the Seven Sages of Greece, Thales of Miletus, Solon of Athens, Bias of Priene, Pittacus of Mytilene, Myson of Chenae, Cleobulus of Lindus and Chilon of Sparta.

The aphorism has also been attributed to various other philosophers. Diogenes Laërtius attributes it to Thales but notes that Antisthenes in his Successions of Philosophers attributes it instead to Phemonoe, a mythical Greek poet. In a discussion of moderation and self-awareness, the Roman poet Juvenal quotes the phrase in Greek and states that the precept descended e caelo (from heaven). Other names of potential include Pythagoras and Heraclitus. The 10th-century Byzantine encyclopedia the Suda recognized Chilon and Thales as the sources of the maxim "Know Thyself" and states: "the proverb is applied to those whose boasts exceed what they are" and that "know thyself" is a warning to pay no attention to the opinion of the multitude.

The authenticity of all such attributions is doubtful; according to Parke and Wormell, "The actual authorship of the three maxims set up on the Delphian temple may be left uncertain. Most likely they were popular proverbs, which tended later to be attributed to particular sages."

See also
 Introspection
 Philosophy of self

References

External links

 Gnothi sauton at Binghamton University
 "The Examined Life", BBC Radio 4 discussion with A.C. Grayling, Janet Radcliffe & Julian Baggini (In Our Time, May 9, 2002)

Delphi
Concepts in ancient Greek epistemology
Spirituality
Classical oracles
Philosophical phrases
Quotations from philosophy
Socrates
Self
Knowledge